The Ciobănuș is a right tributary of the river Trotuș in Romania. Its source is in the Ciuc Mountains, northeast of the city Miercurea Ciuc. It discharges into the Trotuș in the village Ciobănuș.

References

Rivers of Romania
Rivers of Bacău County
Rivers of Harghita County